WUNO (630 AM) is a radio station broadcasting a News Talk Information format. Licensed to San Juan, Puerto Rico, it serves the Puerto Rico area.  The station is currently owned by Arso Radio Corporation and features programming from CNN Radio. The station's programming is also heard on translator station W232DH 94.3 FM, serving the entire metropolitan area.

NotiUno TV

NotiUno TV is an online-video streaming service, owned by Uno Radio Group. NotiUno TV broadcasts news and analysis programming, from its studios in San Juan. NotiUno TV consists of both a 24-hour linear streaming channel and on-demand programming from NotiUno 630 AM. NotiUno TV is available on NotiUno.com or on the NotiUno App.

NotiUno Network

WUNO & W232DH are the flagship stations of the NotiUno Radio Network. WUNO's programming is also heard on WPRP 910 AM & W238DH 95.5 FM in Ponce and the south, WCMN 1280 AM & W221ER 92.1 FM in Arecibo and the north, WORA 760 AM and W260DR 99.9 FM in Mayaguez-Aguadilla and the west and WNEL 1430 AM in Caguas and the central region.

Translator stations

Programming

 Normando en la Mañana con Normando Valentín
 A Palo Limpio con los licenciados Iván Rivera y Ramón Rosario
 Pelota Dura con Ferdinand Pérez
 En La Mirilla con Luis Davila Colon
 La Candela con Ileana Rivera Deliz
 En Caliente con Carmen Jovet
 Sin Ataduras con Zulma Rosario
 Análisis 630 con Kike Cruz
 El Escándalo del Día con Luis Enrique Falú
 NotiUno en la Noche
 Tema Libre
 Contacto NotiUno

Weekend programming

 Mundo Natural
 Cita Medica
 Sobre la Noticia
 Dando Soluciones
 Viva Carolina Tu Revista Radial
 Desde la Sociedad Civil
 Ortopedia al Dia
 Economia 101
 Nuestros Jovenes Conversan
 Siempre Alfred
 Dinares de Iraq y Mucho Mas
 Hasta que la Muerte nos Separe
 Momentos de Amor y de Bohemia
 Alegria para el Alma
 Sembrando Semillas
 Medicina Alternativa
 Vivir con Salud
 Conferencia de Prensa
 Lo Mejor Para Todos
 Sentencia 630
 Politica Social
 Todo Sobre Veteranos
 Cuba 630
 De Cara al Futuro
 Noti Uno Internacional

External links
FCC History Cards for WUNO

 
 

News and talk radio stations in Puerto Rico
UNO
Radio stations established in 1957
1957 establishments in Puerto Rico